
Year 697 (DCXCVII) was a common year starting on Monday (link will display the full calendar) of the Julian calendar. The denomination 697 for this year has been used since the early medieval period, when the Anno Domini calendar era became the prevalent method in Europe for naming years.

Events 
 By place 
 Europe 
 Paolo Lucio Anafesto is elected the first Doge of Venice, which begins its rise as a major power in the Mediterranean Sea. Built up from fishing villages settled by fugitives from the Huns (see 452), the city of Venice occupies some 60 marshy islands (Venetian Lagoon). 
 Radbod, king of the Frisians, retreats to the island of Heligoland in the North Sea (approximate date). 

 Britain 
 Queen Osthryth of Mercia is murdered by her own noblemen. She is buried at Bardney Abbey (Lincolnshire), and later revered as a saint.

 Arabian Empire 
 Syrian forces under Al-Hajjaj ibn Yusuf, governor of Iraq, defeat the Persian Kharijites, who have captured the city of Mosul and occupy large parts of Mesopotamia (approximate date).

 Asia 
 Empress Jitō abdicates the throne in favor of the 14-year-old Monmu (grandson of late emperor Tenmu). During her 11-year reign she has established the foundations of law in Japan.

 Mesoamerica 
 The Mayan city of Bahlam Jol is destroyed by Naranjo as retaliation for rebelling against its suzerain.

 By topic 
 Religion 
 Council of Birr: The northern part of Ireland accepts the Roman calculations for celebrating Easter. At this synod Adomnán, abbot of Iona (Scotland), promulgates his Cáin Adomnáin ("Law of the Innocents").
 A festival, for the opening of the eyes of Buddhist images, is held in Yakushi-ji Temple in Japan (approximate date).

Births 
 Fang Guan, chancellor of the Tang Dynasty (d. 763)
 Guo Ziyi, general of the Tang Dynasty (d. 781)
 Osred I, king of Northumbria (approximate date)

Deaths 
 Eochaid mac Domangairt, king of Dál Riata
 Ferchar Fota, king of Dál Riata (Scotland)
 Hugobert, Merovingian noblemen (seneschal)
 Nordebert, mayor of the palace of Neustria
 Osthryth, queen of Mercia (English Midlands)

References